Vincent Pangelinan (born 14 March 1972) is a Guamanian wrestler. He competed in the men's freestyle 48 kg at the 1992 Summer Olympics.

References

1972 births
Living people
Guamanian male sport wrestlers
Olympic wrestlers of Guam
Wrestlers at the 1992 Summer Olympics
Place of birth missing (living people)